Ryan Carneli (born 11 October 1985 in Melbourne, Victoria) is an Australian taekwondo practitioner. Carneli qualified for the men's 58 kg class at the 2008 Summer Olympics in Beijing, after winning the Oceania Qualification Tournament in Noumea, New Caledonia. He defeated Philippines' Tshomlee Go in the preliminary round of sixteen, before losing out the quarterfinal match to Thailand's Chutchawal Khawlaor, who was able to score two points at the end of the game.

References

External links
Profile – Australian Olympic Team

NBC 2008 Olympics profile

Australian male taekwondo practitioners
1985 births
Living people
Olympic taekwondo practitioners of Australia
Taekwondo practitioners at the 2008 Summer Olympics
Sportspeople from Melbourne
21st-century Australian people